Asovia is a genus of moths in the family Geometridae.

Species
 Asovia maeoticaria (Alphéraky, 1876)

References
 Asovia at Markku Savela's Lepidoptera and Some Other Life Forms

Ourapterygini
Geometridae genera